Nowodwór may refer to the following places:
Nowodwór, Lubartów County in Lublin Voivodeship (east Poland)
Nowodwór, Ryki County in Lublin Voivodeship (east Poland)
Nowodwór, Masovian Voivodeship (east-central Poland)

See also
 Nowy Dwór (disambiguation)